Having Fun with Elvis on Stage is a 1974 spoken word concert album by American singer and musician Elvis Presley consisting entirely of dialogue and banter, mostly jokes, by Presley between songs during his live concerts, with the songs themselves removed from the recordings. The album was created as a ploy by Presley's manager Colonel Tom Parker to release a Presley album through his own label, Boxcar Records, without using content that contractually belonged to RCA Records, so that Parker could earn 100% of the profits. Having Fun with Elvis on Stage was first sold at Presley's concerts, but RCA later claimed rights to the recordings and began to package and distribute it.

Having Fun with Elvis on Stage has been considered Presley's worst album; many critics felt that the compilation of banter was incoherent and lacked context with the removal of the songs. In their 1991 book, Jimmy Guterman and Owen O'Donnell named Having Fun with Elvis on Stage the worst rock-and-roll album of all time, noting its lack of actual "rock and roll." Though Presley hated the album and insisted that it be withdrawn, RCA reissued it shortly after his death in 1977. Having Fun with Elvis on Stage reached number 130 on the Billboard 200 and peaked at number 9 on the Billboard Hot Country LPs.

Content and release
The album is unique in Elvis Presley's discography as it does not contain any actual music or songs; it consists entirely of Presley talking between numbers, recorded during live concerts. Presley is frequently heard humming or singing "Well ...", which, during the actual performances, led into songs that were edited out of the recording. Much of the album consists of Presley making jokes, although the recording is devoid of context. Despite the seeming randomness of the audio, from 8:01–11:55 on side A, Presley speaks about his early life and career aspirations before becoming a singer, as well as his early appearance on The Steve Allen Show.

The album was the idea of Colonel Tom Parker, Presley's manager. Parker wished to release an Presley album through Boxcar Records, a company that he formed to manage Presley's commercial rights, so that he could profit directly from it. However, because Presley was signed to RCA Records, the song recordings legally belonged to RCA. In an attempt to circumvent this restriction, Parker compiled audio of Presley talking, rather than singing, material for which he erroneously believed RCA could not claim rights.

Initially, the album was sold only at Presley's concerts. Parker was soon informed that any Presley sound recording made while under contract to RCA Records legally belonged to the label. RCA soon claimed legal rights to the recordings and the album was later packaged and reissued on the RCA Victor label, with the same cover art as the Boxcar release and message reading "A Talking Album Only" on the front cover. Presley is credited on the back cover as the album's executive producer.

Reception

Having Fun with Elvis on Stage has been described as the worst album of Elvis Presley's career. Many critics felt that the album's material was spliced in a manner lacking continuity and nearly devoid of comprehensibility or humor. Mark Deming of AllMusic states that "some have called Having Fun with Elvis on Stage thoroughly unlistenable, but actually it's worse than that; hearing it is like witnessing an auto wreck that somehow plowed into a carnival freak show, leaving onlookers at once too horrified and too baffled to turn away." Nick Greene, a writer for Mental Floss, felt that the material presented on the record is "so incoherent, you don't really get an idea of his stage presence, despite the fact that all the audio comes from his shows." Rock critics Jimmy Guterman and Owen O'Donnell, writing in their 1991 book The Worst Rock and Roll Records of All Time, named it the worst rock album ever.

The album peaked at number 130 on the main Billboard album chart and peaked at number 9 on the Billboard Hot Country LPs chart. The album was eventually deleted. RCA has never reissued the original album on compact disc, although unofficial pirated CD editions have been available, as well as a series of three 10" records released in the United Kingdom.

Track listing
Side A  – 18:06
Side B  – 19:00

Personnel
 Elvis Presley – speeches

Charts

See also
List of music considered the worst

References

External links

1974 live albums
Elvis Presley live albums
Spoken word albums by American artists
Unauthorized albums